The 1964 Navy Midshipmen men's soccer team represented the United States Naval Academy during the 1964 NCAA Division I men's soccer season. The Midshipmen won their first modern-day NCAA title this season.

Schedule 

|-
!colspan=6 style="background:#00005D; color:#D4AF37;"| Regular Season
|-

|-

|-

|-

|-

|-

|-

|-

|-

|-

|-

|-
!colspan=6 style="background:#00005D; color:#D4AF37;"| NCAA Tournament
|-

|-

|-

|-

|-

References 

 Results (p. 30)

Navy Midshipmen men's soccer seasons
1964 NCAA soccer independents season
NCAA Division I Men's Soccer Tournament-winning seasons
NCAA Division I Men's Soccer Tournament College Cup seasons
Navy